Skautafélag Akureyar, also known as SA for short, is an Icelandic sports club founded in 1937 and based in Akureyri, Iceland. It is best known for its ice hockey teams that compete in the Icelandic Men's Hockey League and the Icelandic Women's Hockey League.

Men's ice hockey
SA's men's team, known as SA Víkingar, has won 23 league titles, the most in its league's history.

Achievements
 Icelandic champion (23): 1992, 1993, 1994, 1995, 1996, 1997, 1998, 2001, 2002, 2003, 2004, 2005, 2008, 2010, 2011, 2013, 2014, 2015, 2016, 2018, 2019, 2021, 2022.

Women's ice hockey
SA has fielded two teams in the Úrvalsdeild kvenna, SA Ásynjur and SA Ynjur, the latter consisting of its U-20 players.

SA Ásynjur
SA Ásynjur is the most successful team in the history of the Úrvalsdeild kvenna, winning 20 titles since 2001.

Achievements
 Icelandic champion (20): 2001, 2002, 2003, 2004, 2005, 2007, 2008, 2009, 2010, 2011, 2012, 2013, 2014, 2015, 2016, 2018, 2019, 2020, 2021, 2022.

SA Ynjur
SA Ynjur won its lone championship in 2017.

Achievements
 Icelandic champion (1): 2017

References

External links
 Official Site
 Team profile on eurohockey.com

Ice hockey teams in Iceland
Sports clubs established in 1937
1937 establishments in Iceland
Icelandic Hockey League
Sport in Akureyri